The third election to the City and County of Swansea Council were held in May 2004. It was preceded by the 1999 election and followed by the 2008 election.

Overview
All council seats were up for election. These were the third elections held following local government reorganisation and the abolition of West Glamorgan County Council. The Labour Party lost their majority on the authority.

Candidates
The contests were fought by most of the main parties but Labour was the only one to contest the majority of seats.

Overall Result

|}

Results

* = sitting councillor in this ward prior to election

Bishopston (one seat)

Bonymaen (two seats)

Castle (four seats)

Clydach (two seats)
Sylvia Lewis had been elected as an Independent in 1999.

Cockett (four seats)

Cwmbwrla (three seats)

Dunvant (two seats)

Fairwood (one seat)
Elected as an Independent in 1995, John Bushell successfully defended the seat as a Conservative in 1999 but now again stood, unsuccessfully, as an Independent.

Gorseinon (one seat)

Gower (one seat)

Gowerton (one seat)

Killay North (one seat)

Killay South (one seat)

Kingsbridge (one seat)

Landore (two seats)

Llangyfelach (one seat)

Llansamlet (four seats)
Elected as an Independent in 1999, June Evans subsequently joined the Independent group.

Lower Loughor (one seat)

Mawr (one seat)

Mayals (one seat)

Morriston (five seats)

Mynyddbach (three seats)

Newton (one seat)

Oystermouth (one seat)

Penclawdd (one seat)

Penderry (three seats)

Penllergaer (one seat)

Pennard (one seat)

Penyrheol (two seats)

Pontarddulais (two seats)

Sketty (five seats)

St. Thomas (two seats)

Townhill (three seats)

Uplands (four seats)

Upper Loughor (two seats)
Possible boundary change. the number of seats was reduced from two to one

West Cross (two seats)

References

2004
Swansea
21st century in Swansea